Empty Eyes may refer to:

 Empty Eyes (1953 film)
 Empty Eyes (2001 film)
 Empty Eyes (CSI: Crime Scene Investigation episode)
 Empty Eyes, a 2013 album by To the Wind